(DVW) (English: German Publisher of Sciences) was a scientific publishing house in the former German Democratic Republic (GDR/).

During the first ten years, DVW, for the most part, published mathematical and scientific literature aimed at university education. About 780 titles were introduced with a total print run of some 3.7 million books.

Whilst more than a third of the production was distributed into Western foreign countries, the publisher still did not make a profit due to the fixed low book prices, politically motivated so called  (PAOs) dictated by the East German government. In 1988, with a turnaround of 8.4 million East German mark, DVW lost 1.3 million East German .

During the German reunification, the publishing house was converted into a GmbH on 30 June 1990, and cost-cutting measures were implemented. In February 1992, DVW stopped all its activities. The GmbH went into liquidation and was dissolved in 1995.

See also 
 Verlag Harri Deutsch

References 
NB. This work is based on the author's dissertation at  under the title  in 2008.)

Academic publishing companies
Publishing companies of Germany
Book publishing companies of Germany
Companies based in Berlin
Publishing companies established in 1954
Publishing companies disestablished in 1995